HMS Phoebe was a  light cruiser of the Royal Navy. She was built by Fairfield Shipbuilding and Engineering Company (Govan, Scotland), her keel was laid down on 2 September 1937. She was launched on 25 March 1939, and commissioned on 30 September 1940.

History

Mediterranean

Phoebes first six months were spent in the Home Fleet, escorting troop convoys on the first stage of their long voyage via the Cape to the Middle East. In April 1941 she was transferred to the 7th Cruiser Squadron in the Mediterranean. Enemy-held territory here was to keep the British Fleet busy for the next two-and-a-half years, and Phoebe was to have her fair share of the action. One of her first operations was the evacuation of troops from Greece and Crete, which was followed quickly by the Syria landings and transporting troops to and from Tobruk.

Africa
Her route was from Simonstown in South Africa to Freetown Sierra Leone but the ship had to refuel at Pointe Noire. Two U-boats (U-161 and ) were patrolling that area at the time.

After the hit, a corvette coming up from the harbour prevented the U-boat from finishing off the cruiser. About 60 crew members were killed. After temporary repairs, Phoebe made for New York for complete repairs. It was an incredible feat to sail  with a gaping hole in her hull. The repairs were not completed until June 1943. In October 1943, she returned to the Mediterranean to take part in the Aegean operations.

Far East

In May 1944, Phoebe was transferred to the Eastern Fleet and was involved in strike operations against the Andaman Islands, Sabang in Northern Sumatra and the Nicobar Islands. In January 1945,  she was switched to supporting amphibious operations in Burma and was engaged in actions against Akyab, Ramree Island off the Arakan Coast, and Cheduba Island. From April to  May 1945, Phoebe was involved in the amphibious assault on Rangoon as part of the East Indies Fleet's, 21st Aircraft Carrier Squadron.

Post war

After VJ-Day, Phoebe returned home for refitting and spent five years in the peacetime Mediterranean Fleet. In early 1948, the cruiser took elements of Royal Marines 40 Commando to Haifa, to assist in the British withdrawal from Mandate Palestine. On 30 June Phoebe embarked the last G. O. C. Palestine and rearguard troops, as the evacuation was completed. After a period in reserve she was sold for scrap in 1956.

References

Bibliography

Further reading

Dido-class cruisers
Ships built in Govan
1939 ships
World War II cruisers of the United Kingdom
Cold War cruisers of the United Kingdom
Maritime incidents in October 1942